Françoise Macchi (born 12 July 1951) is a French former alpine skier.

Macchi was born at Le Sentier, Switzerland. She married the fellow skier Jean-Noël Augert.

World cup victories

References

1951 births
Living people
French female alpine skiers
FIS Alpine Ski World Cup champions